The 2015–16 season of Romania's top level women's football league was the third under the new name Superliga. The old name Liga I is now being used for the new second-level league. It is the 26th season of top-level football and will decide the Romanian champions and UEFA Women's Champions League participant.

Olimpia Cluj were the defending champions.

Changes from 2014 to 2015
 Universitatea Alexandria, CS Brazi and CFR Timişoara were relegated to Liga I.
 Navobi Iași, Independența Baia Mare and Vasas Odorhei were promoted to Superliga.

2015/16 teams

Format
The 8 teams play each other twice, for a total of 14 matches, with the top four teams qualifying for a championship round and the bottom four teams playing a relegation round. Points accumulated at the regular season are halved and added to the points of the final stage rounds.

Regular season

League table

Results

Final Stage
Each team carries the points of the regular season (which are halved and rounded up), adding them to the points scored at this final stage.

Championship Group
Played by the teams placed first to fourth of the regular season. Teams play each other twice.
League table

Relegation Group
Played by the teams placed fifth to eighth of the regular season. Teams play each other twice. Because of the league expansion from 8 to 10 teams, no team was relegated and all of the four played the next season as well.

League table

References

External links
 Official site
 Season on soccerway.com

Rom
Fem
Romanian Superliga (women's football) seasons